Alexandr Valerevich Ivanov (born May 25, 1982 in Saint Petersburg) is a Russian javelin thrower. His personal best throw is 88.90 metres, achieved in June 2003 in Tula.

Achievements

Seasonal bests by year
2000 - 77.11
2001 - 83.55
2002 - 87.62
2003 - 88.90
2004 - 87.73
2005 - 84.24
2006 - 84.22
2007 - 86.71
2008 - 83.21
2009 - 82.40
2010 - 77.11
2011 - 82.17
2013 - 70.50
2014 - 74.75

References

 

1982 births
Living people
Athletes from Saint Petersburg
Russian male javelin throwers
Olympic male javelin throwers
Olympic athletes of Russia
Athletes (track and field) at the 2004 Summer Olympics
Athletes (track and field) at the 2008 Summer Olympics
World Athletics Championships athletes for Russia
Russian Athletics Championships winners